Alistair Michael Coote (born 11 June 1998) is a Scottish professional footballer who plays for Irish club Bohemians as a midfielder. He began his career with Dundee United and made his first team debut in 2015, before joining Brentford B in 2017. He represented Scotland at U15, U16 and U17 level.

Early life 
Coote was born in Bedford, England and grew up in Newport-on-Tay, Fife, Scotland. He attended St John's Roman Catholic High School in Dundee. While playing for Bohemians, he shared a house in Dunboyne with Liam Burt, Stephen Mallon and Georgie Kelly.

Club career

Dundee United 
A box-to-box midfielder, Coote began his youth career with Tayport Thistle, before moving to the academy at Dundee United. By late 2013, his performances saw him named by STV as one of 14 youth players to make an impact in 2014. Coote signed his first professional contract in June 2014 and won his maiden call into the first team squad for a Scottish Premiership match versus Celtic on 21 December 2014. He remained an unused substitute during the 2–1 victory. Coote broke into the matchday squad on a regular basis in the final two months of the 2014–15 season and made his professional debut as a substitute for Calum Butcher after 76 minutes of a 1–0 defeat to Aberdeen on 18 April 2015. He finished the 2014–15 season with three appearances.

Despite appearing regularly for the Development Squad, Coote won only three calls into the first team squad during the 2015–16 season and spent much of the second half of the season away on loan at Scottish League Two club East Fife. After returning from the loan, he made his sole appearance of the season as a second-half substitute in a 3–2 victory over Inverness Caledonian Thistle on 6 May 2016. With SPFL rules stating that a player returning from loan after 31 March is not eligible to play for his parent club during the same season, the rule breach led to Dundee United being deducted three points and fined £30,000.

Dundee United's relegation to the Scottish Championship at the end of the 2015–16 season saw Coote promoted into the first team squad for 2016–17 and he was a regular inclusion on the substitutes' bench throughout the campaign. He made his first start for the club in the 2017 Scottish Challenge Cup Final versus St Mirren and won the first senior trophy of his career in the 2–1 victory. His season ended with defeat in the Scottish Premiership play-offs to Hamilton Academical. Coote made 16 appearances during the 2016–17 season and departed the club in June 2017. He made 20 appearances and scored no goals during three seasons as a professional at Tannadice Park.

Brentford B 
On 22 June 2017, Coote moved to England to join the B team at Championship club Brentford on a three-year contract for an undisclosed fee. He made 33 appearances and scored 9 goals during the 2017–18 season. Coote had a successful 2018–19 season, winning the team's Player of the Year award and the Middlesex Senior Cup. After loanee Nikolaj Kirk departed the club in March 2019, Coote took over the B team captaincy. During the 2019–20 pre-season, Coote was included in the first team squad for its training camp in Austria. He was frozen out of the B team during the first half of the 2019–20 season and departed Brentford in January 2020. He made 79 appearances and scored 19 goals in three seasons for the B team, but failed to receive a call into a first team matchday squad.

Waterford 
On 24 January 2020, Coote transferred to League of Ireland Premier Division club Waterford on permanent contract. He made 18 appearances and scored three goals during the COVID-19-affected 2020 season and departed the club at the end of the campaign.

Bohemians 
On 24 December 2020, it was announced that Coote had transferred to League of Ireland Premier Division club Bohemians. He immediately became a starter for the team and was named the League of Ireland Player of the Month for August 2021, during which he scored three goals in four appearances, which included a brace in a 2–1 UEFA Europa Conference League third qualifying round first leg victory over PAOK. The following month, Coote signed a one-year contract extension and he finished the 2021 season with 41 appearances and seven goals. Coote made 32 appearances and scored two goals during a mid-table 2022 season.

International career 
Coote made his international debut for Scotland at U15 level and won the first of his eight caps in an U15 tournament match versus Italy on 20 March 2012. He won five caps for the U16 team during the 2013–14 season and made appearances in both the 2013 Valerie Ivanov Tournament (scoring his first international goal) and the 2014 Aegean Cup. Coote experienced success in the 2013–14 Victory Shield, scoring his first international brace (versus Northern Ireland) and playing the full 90 minutes of the 1–0 victory in the final versus England. He won five U17 caps during the 2014–15 season and was called into the squad for the 2015 European U17 Championship finals, but was withdrawn from the tournament at the request of Dundee United.

Career statistics

Honours 
Dundee United
 Scottish Challenge Cup: 2016–17
Brentford B
 Middlesex Senior Cup: 2018–19

Scotland U16
 Victory Shield: 2013–14

Individual

 Brentford B Player of the Year: 2018–19
 League of Ireland Player of the Month: August 2021

References

External links 

Ali Coote at bohemianfc.com

Living people
1998 births
Scottish footballers
Association football midfielders
Dundee United F.C. players
Scottish Professional Football League players
Scotland youth international footballers
Sportspeople from Bedford
People from Newport-on-Tay
East Fife F.C. players
Brentford F.C. players
Waterford F.C. players
League of Ireland players
Bohemian F.C. players
Footballers from Bedfordshire